The Estadio de la UNMSM is a multi-purpose stadium located in Lima, Peru, belonging to the National University of San Marcos. It was inaugurated on May 13, 1951, with a seating capacity of 32,000 and covers an area of 48,782 m². Safety measures have been taken and they have reduced the maximum to 32,000 for the safety of the public. The stadium is used by several Peruvian teams who do not have a home ground. It has a running track and is near an archaeological excavation site known as Huaca San Marcos, which is also located in the center of the University City of the National University of San Marcos. In 2019, it was the main stadium for the football matches of the 2019 South American U-17 Championship and the 2019 Pan American Games.

Today is an alternate stadium of the football team Club Universitario de Deportes, which plays in the First Division of Peru. Previously, it was the official stadium of the football team of the university, the Club Deportivo Universidad San Marcos, which played in the Second Division of Peru. Besides the stadium is used for extracurricular activities for students, teachers and administrators at the University of San Marcos

History 

The stadium of the University of San Marcos began to be built around 1943 as part of the work of the then "Pro-Unemployed Board". The western platform was placed on the Huaca Concha, the northernmost of the Complex Maranga. The other stands were built with extra padding it. The esplanade match the old sports archaeological plaza located east of Huaca. Officially opened on 13 May 1951, commemorating the 400th anniversary of founding of the Universidad Nacional Mayor de San Marcos; the opening generated great expectations as the first large-capacity stadium in Peru, which was attended by then-President Manuel Odria, his education minister and the chancellor of the university. The opening match was between the Sport Boys of Callao and Palmeiras of Brazil.

For its construction on archaeological stuffed unstable over the years, cracks appeared in the stands and large slumps. In 1993 the government of Alberto Fujimori earmarked money for the renovation of the stadium. When machines raised the floor of the esplanade of the western grandstand, which was hardest hit, were exposed bale walls and archaeological 1,500 years old. Despite this, he set the fence and custody of the place, and built new footings on the archaeological architecture.

Sport events
The Stadium is also used for other kind of activities such as:

 Special Olympics (1951)
 National College Sports (1955)
 Sports National University (1983)
 2019 South American U-17 Championship
 2019 Pan American Games

Concerts

Van Halen - February 18, 1983 - Hide Your Sheep Tour
Metallica - January 19, 2010 - World Magnetic Tour
Korn - April 15, 2010
Gustavo Cerati - April 24, 2010
Bon Jovi - September 29, 2010
Green Day - October 26, 2010
The Smashing Pumpkins and Stereophonics - November 25, 2010
Issac Delgado and Manolin - December 10, 2010
Iron Maiden - March 23, 2011
Shakira - March 25, 2011, with Ziggy Marley and Train
Slayer - June 11, 2011
Bad Religion - October 7, 2011
Aerosmith - October 22, 2011
Pearl Jam - November 18, 2011
Noel Gallagher's High Flying Birds - May 11, 2012
Juanes - Juanes MTV Unplugged Tour September 12, 2012
Evanescence - October 25, 2012
Lady Gaga - Born This Way Ball Tour - November 23, 2012
Blur - October 29, 2013.
Nightwish - Endless Forms Most Beautiful World Tour - October 6, 2015
Festival VIVO X EL ROCK 6 With Sum 41, Collective Soul, Hoobastank, Puddle of Mudd, Sepultura, The Casualties - December 12, 2015
Festival VIVO X EL ROCK 8 With Sum 41, Garbage, Hoobastank, The Cranberries, Los Fabulosos Cadillacs, Fito Páez, Papa Roach, Miguel Mateos, Aterciopelados - December 17, 2016
Green Day - Revolution Radio Tour - November 14, 2017
Guns N' Roses - Guns N' Roses 2020 Tour - October 8, 2022
Super Junior - Super Show 9: Road - February 11, 2023
Mötley Crüe and Def Leppard – The World Tour – February 28, 2023
Ultra Peru - April 22, 2023
Paramore - March 2, 2023

References

External links 
 Peruvian Football Federation (in Spanish)

Football venues in Lima
National University of San Marcos
Deportivo Universidad San Marcos
Multi-purpose stadiums in Peru
Sports venues in Lima
Venues of the 2019 Pan and Parapan American Games